The following is a list of Oricon number-one singles of 1998.

Oricon Weekly Singles Chart

References 

1998 in Japanese music
Japan Oricon
Oricon 1998